Opsophagus is a genus of parasitic flies in the family Tachinidae. There are at least two described species in Opsophagus.

Species
These two species belong to the genus Opsophagus:
 Opsophagus nigripalpis Aldrich, 1926
 Opsophagus ornatus Aldrich, 1926

References

Further reading

 
 
 
 

Tachinidae
Monotypic Brachycera genera
Articles created by Qbugbot